Ibrahim Khalil (1 January 1916–19 September 1974) was a Bangladeshi writer, playwright and eminent educationist. He received the Bangla Academy Literary Award in 1970 for his play.

Career 
Ibrahim Khalil was born on 1 January 1916. He lived in Bangla bazar of old Dhaka. He was the headmaster of Muslim High School. After retirement, he was the headmaster of Dhaka Pagoz High School. He was involved in literary work for a long time. Her novels, plays, stories and travelogues were well received by Sudhijan. He was also involved with Dhaka Betar Kendra. His first play Samadhi was published in 1949. He wanted to establish Islamic ideology in his plays. Such a dream has tempted him to compose plays.

Awards and honors 

 Bangla Academy Literary Award (1970)

Bibliography 

 সমাধি (1957)
 স্পেন বিজয়ী মুসা (1949)
 ফিরিঙ্গী হার্মাদ (1953)
 ফিরিঙ্গীরাজ (1954)
 কিসসা নয়, কাহিনী (1956)
 নূরজাহান (1970)
 শের শাহ্‌
 সীমান্তের চিঠি
 বাংলা ব্যাকরণ

Death 
Ibrahim Khalil died on 19 September 1974.

See also 

 List of Bangla Academy Literary Award recipients (1970–1979)

References 

1916 births
1974 deaths
Bangladeshi educators
Recipients of Bangla Academy Award
Bangladeshi writers
Bangladeshi dramatists and playwrights